Kurt Meier (born 6 April 1962) is a Swiss bobsledder who competed from the mid-1980s to the mid-1990s. Competing in two Winter Olympics, he won two medals in the four-man event with a gold in 1988 and a silver in 1994.

Meier also won two gold medals in the four-man event at the FIBT World Championships, earning them in 1986 and 1993.

References
 Bobsleigh four-man Olympic medalists for 1924, 1932-56, and since 1964
 Bobsleigh four-man world championship medalists since 1930

External links
 
 

1962 births
Bobsledders at the 1988 Winter Olympics
Bobsledders at the 1994 Winter Olympics
Living people
Olympic gold medalists for Switzerland
Olympic silver medalists for Switzerland
Olympic bobsledders of Switzerland
Swiss male bobsledders
Olympic medalists in bobsleigh
Medalists at the 1988 Winter Olympics
Medalists at the 1994 Winter Olympics